The Jequiá River is a river in the state of Alagoas, Brazil.

In its lower reaches the river broadens into the Lagoa Jequiá, which is protected by the  Lagoa do Jequiá Marine Extractive Reserve, created in 2002.
It then flows past the seat of the municipality of Jequiá da Praia before entering the Atlantic Ocean.

See also
List of rivers of Alagoas

References

Rivers of Alagoas